Under Suspicion is a 1937 American mystery film directed by Lewis D. Collins and starring Jack Holt, Katherine DeMille and Luis Alberni.

Synopsis
Millionaire automobile manufacturer Robert Bailey announces that he plans to turn over ownership of his company to the employees. This outrages his fellow stockholders and two attempts are made to kill him. Bailey summons them all to his lodge in order to try and work out which is the potential murderer.

Cast

References

Bibliography
 Goble, Alan. The Complete Index to Literary Sources in Film. Walter de Gruyter, 1999.

External links
 

1937 films
1937 mystery films
1930s English-language films
American mystery films
Films directed by Lewis D. Collins
Columbia Pictures films
1930s American films